The Sanford Titans were a junior "B" ice hockey team based in Sanford, Manitoba, and members of the Keystone Junior Hockey League (KJHL). The franchise was founded in 2008.

Coaches
 Mike Demidiuk, 2008–

External links
KJHL.ca

Defunct ice hockey teams in Manitoba